The Nahua people such as the Aztecs, Chichimecs and the Toltecs believed that the heavens were constructed and separated into 13 levels, usually called Topan or simply each one Ilhuicatl iohhui, Ilhuicatl iohtlatoquiliz. Each level had from one to many Lords (gods) living in and ruling them.

Aztec mythology 

In Aztec mythology, the Thirteen Heavens were formed out of Cipactli's head when the gods made creation out of its body, whereas Tlaltícpac, the earth, was made from its center and the nine levels of the underworld (Mictlan) from its tail.

The most important of these heavens was Omeyocan (Place of Two), where Ometeotl - the dual Lord/Lady, creator of the Dual-Genesis who, as male, takes the name Ometecuhtli (Two Lord), and as female is named Omecihuatl (Two Lady) - resided.

References

Bibliography

See also 
 Aztec mythology
 Aztec philosophy
 List of Aztec gods and supernatural beings

Locations in Aztec mythology
Locations in Mesoamerican mythology
Afterlife places